The Cheyenne Mountain Zoo is a zoological park located southwest of downtown Colorado Springs, Colorado, on Cheyenne Mountain in the United States. At an elevation of 6,714 feet (2,046 m) above sea level, it is the highest zoo in America. The zoo covers 140 acres, 40 of which are in use. The zoo houses more than 750 animals, representing nearly 150 different species, with more than 30 endangered species. The zoo was ranked the #4 best zoo in North America in 2018 by USA Today. It is accredited by the Association of Zoos and Aquariums.

History
Business man Spencer Penrose was given a gift of a bear in 1916 which inspired him to collect animals. Animals were housed at Penrose's Broadmoor Hotel until a monkey bit a hotel guest. Cheyenne Mountain Zoo was founded in 1926 to house the collection of exotic animals. In 1938, Spencer Penrose incorporated the Zoo as a non-profit public trust to the people of Colorado Springs.

Cheyenne Mountain Zoo is a non-profit 501(c)(3) organization and does not receive local or regional public tax support.

On August 6, 2018, the zoo was hit by fast-moving and unexpected severe weather that brought with it baseball-sized hail. The staff was praised in national media and by the Association of Zoos and Aquariums for their use of the incident command system to swiftly move animals and visitors indoors. But just as some humans were confused and didn't know where to go, many animals stayed outside in confusion despite having on-exhibit dens as required by the AZA. Three zoo employees were hospitalized following efforts to save animals and guests from the unusually large hail. Several animals were hospitalized as well and five animals including two peafowl, a cape vulture and Muscovy duck died of their injuries.

Giraffe herd history 
Cheyenne Mountain is known for its large and prolific giraffe herd. Two hundred giraffes have been born at the zoo since 1954. When Dobby the giraffe was born at the Denver Zoo in 2017 without the necessary antibodies for survival, Cheyenne Mountain sent banked giraffe plasma from their herd to Denver. The subsequent blood transfusion was successful and Dobby survived.

Exhibits
African Rift Valley is an African savanna themed exhibit containing African crowned cranes, African lions, African spurred tortoises, cattle egrets, Colobus monkeys, Grant's zebra, griffon vultures, helmeted guineafowl, meerkats, okapis, red river hogs, reticulated giraffe, and rock hyrax. African Rift Valley cost $11 million to build.

Encounter Africa opened at a cost of $13.5 million. The Encounter Africa exhibit is home to African cape porcupines, African elephants, eastern black rhinoceros, and meerkats. The exhibit received special recognition at the 2014 AZA Honors and Awards event.

Australia Walkabout: This exhibit contains a walk-through red-necked wallaby yard, a budgie aviary, emus, American alligators, shelducks, White's tree frogs, Matschie's tree kangaroo, and other species.

Scutes Family Gallery was originally built in the early 1940s and formally known as the Bird and Reptile House. It contains over 40 species of reptiles including Burmese pythons, lizards, snakes, tortoises and turtles. The name refers to the scutes, or scales that are on most reptiles. Funding for the renovation came from the $13.5 million campaign for the Encounter Africa exhibit.

Bear Grottos: Asiatic black and Spectacled bears.

The Loft: An educational exhibit building that houses American beavers, black-footed ferrets, chinchillas, eclectus parrots, lizards, prairie dogs, ravens, skunks, snakes, three-banded armadillos, tortoises, and Wyoming toads.

Monkey Pavilion: Originally opened in 1942 to house big cats, the building now exhibits smaller primate species including lar gibbons, white-cheeked gibbons, ring-tailed lemurs, Geoffroy's marmosets, Hoffman's two-toed sloths, black howler monkeys, black mangabeys, black and white ruffed lemurs, brown-nosed coatis, white-nosed coatis, Goeldi's monkeys, and Wolf's guenons. On 20 September 2020, the Zoo announced plans to demolish the pavilion.

Tapir Exhibit: A new tapir exhibit opened in 2015 after the zoo's mountain tapirs were living in an off-exhibit area since 2012 due to the construction of Encounter Africa. Cheyenne Mountain and the Los Angeles Zoo are the only two zoos in the United States to exhibit mountain tapirs.

My Big Backyard: Chickens, rabbits, koi, amphibians, tortoises, and invertebrates are exhibited here.

Asian Highlands exhibits Amur tigers, Amur leopards, snow leopards, and Pallas' cats in naturalistic habitats on the zoo's mountain side.

Rocky Mountain Wild: Costing the zoo $8.2 million, Rocky Mountain Wild houses bald eagles, Canadian lynx, Greenback cutthroat trout, Grizzly bears, Merganser ducks, Mexican wolves, moose, cougars, porcupines, river otters, rainbow trout, and Rio Grande turkeys.

Primate World: Primate World contains apes and other animals. Sumatran and Bornean orangutans, Western lowland gorillas, siamangs, and naked mole rats are exhibited.

Rocky Cliffs: Rocky Mountain goats.

Water's Edge: Africa: This new exhibit houses Nile hippopotamuses, African penguins, and other species. The exhibit opened in 2020.

Conservation
The zoo breeds endangered animals such as the. black-footed ferrets, Wyoming toads, mountain tapirs and Mexican gray wolves. The zoo participates in over 30 Species Survival Plan programs.

It financially supports multiple field conservation programs through Quarters for Conservation which allows guests to choose what programs the zoo supports. The zoo recently reached $2 million raised through the program since 2008. It also participates in the Panama Amphibian Rescue and Conservation project along with the Houston Zoo, the Smithsonian Tropical Research Institute, the Smithsonian Conservation Biology Institute, and Zoo New England to release endangered amphibian species back to the wild.

Other attractions
Carousel: The c. 1925 Allan Herschell Company carousel, active at the Zoo since 1937.

Mountaineer Sky Ride: an open-air, ski lift style ride above the Rocky Mountain goat, grizzly bear and Amur tiger exhibits. .

Will Rogers Shrine of the Sun: Admission to the zoo includes access to the Cheyenne Mountain Highway and Will Rogers Shrine of the Sun.

Notes

References
In Between the Spots at Cheyenne Mountain Zoo - Blog
Cheyenne Mountain Zoo and the Palm Oil Crisis - Blog
Cheyenne Mountain Zoo Frog Blog

External links

Zoos in Colorado
Zoo
Tourist attractions in Colorado Springs, Colorado
Buildings and structures in Colorado Springs, Colorado
Protected areas of El Paso County, Colorado
Geography of Colorado Springs, Colorado
Zoos established in 1926